Trenton Jacoby Brown (born April 13, 1993) is an American football offensive tackle for the New England Patriots of the National Football League (NFL). He played college football at Georgia Military College and Florida, and was drafted by the San Francisco 49ers in the seventh round of the 2015 NFL Draft.

Early years
Brown was born in Bastrop, Texas on April 13, 1993. He attended Deerfield-Windsor School before transferring to Westover Comprehensive High School, both in Albany, Georgia, and played basketball his first two years of high school before moving to football his junior year. Brown graduated from Westover High in 2011.

College career

Georgia Military College
Brown enrolled in Georgia Military College in Milledgeville, Georgia in the fall of 2011. He played for the GMC Bulldogs for two years, where the Bulldogs running game averaged 188 yards-per-game. After displaying his skills at the junior college level, where he was named a second team NJCAA All-American in 2012, Brown was recruited by several NCAA Division I schools, including Arizona, Arkansas, Florida State, Georgia, Kansas, LSU, Oklahoma, Ole Miss, Mississippi State and Texas A&M.

Florida
Brown eventually chose to continue his college career at the University of Florida, signing a National Letter of Intent in December 2012 and enrolling in May 2013. Standing at 6-foot-8 and weighing 363 pounds, Brown was the Gators biggest offensive lineman since Max Starks, who played for the team in 2003 and is believed to be the biggest player to ever wear a Florida Gators uniform. At the beginning of his first year at Florida, Brown was used mainly on field goals and "Jumbo" packages in short yardage situations. He took over the starting tackle job in the Georgia game after Tyler Moore was injured and lost for the year. Brown moved to starting guard at the beginning of the 2014 season.

Professional career

San Francisco 49ers
On May 2, 2015, Brown was selected by the San Francisco 49ers in the 7th round with the 244th overall pick of the 2015 NFL Draft. Brown started the last 2 regular season games of his rookie season and played in a total of 5 games.

After being asked in an interview to name the blocker that gives him the most trouble, Denver Broncos' linebacker and Super Bowl MVP Von Miller said, "I feel like Trent Brown has a very bright future in the National Football League. He's 6-foot-8. He knows how to use his arms, knows how to use his wingspan and he has length. So I feel like he's young and people haven’t really seen him, but I feel like he’s one of the better tackles in the National Football League." On August 16, 2017, Miller made a similar remark about Brown to the San Francisco Chronicle after the Broncos and 49ers had a joint practice, stating, "He's the best right tackle in the National Football League! And he may even be a top-five tackle, period, in the National Football League. There’s not another tackle who’s that tall, that big and can move the way he moves.”
Brown started all 16 regular season games for the 49ers in 2016.

In 2017, Brown started 10 games at right tackle before being placed on injured reserve on December 16, 2017 with a shoulder injury.

New England Patriots
On April 27, 2018, Brown was traded along with the 143rd selection in the 2018 NFL Draft to the New England Patriots for the 95th selection (Tarvarius Moore). Brown's arrival was part of Patriots head coach Bill Belichick's attempt to build one of the heaviest rosters for a power-running offense. After playing right tackle during his tenure with the 49ers, Brown became the Patriots starting left tackle in 2018, starting all 16 games. With Brown, the Patriots reached and went on to win Super Bowl LIII.

Oakland / Las Vegas Raiders
On March 13, 2019, Brown signed a four-year, $66 million contract with the Oakland Raiders with $36.75 million guaranteed, making him the highest-paid offensive lineman in the league. Head coach Jon Gruden announced that Brown would play right tackle with Kolton Miller remaining at left tackle. In his first 11 games with the Raiders, Brown allowed only one sack in 326 pass-blocking snaps. On December 17, 2019, Brown was named a Pro Bowl selection for the first time of his career. The next day, he was placed on IR, ending his season.

Brown was placed on the reserve/COVID-19 list by the Raiders on October 21, 2020, and was activated on October 30. Just before their Week 8 game, Brown was hospitalized after a pregame IV caused air to enter his bloodstream and missed the game. He was placed back on the COVID-19 list on November 5, and activated again on December 2.

New England Patriots (second stint)
On March 17, 2021, Brown and a 2022 seventh-round pick were traded to the New England Patriots for a 2022 fifth-round pick. He was named the Patriots starting right tackle. He suffered a calf injury in Week 1, missed the next three games, then placed on injured reserve on October 9, 2021. He was activated on November 13.

Brown was re-signed by the Patriots on March 21, 2022 to a two-year, $13 million contract. Originally brought back to be the Patriots' right tackle again, the team chose to move Brown back to left tackle in the 2022 preseason, which was the position he originally played for them in 2018.

References

External links
 Florida Gators bio
 Las Vegas Raiders bio

1993 births
Living people
People from Bastrop, Texas
Sportspeople from Albany, Georgia
African-American players of American football
American football offensive tackles
Players of American football from Georgia (U.S. state)
Florida Gators football players
San Francisco 49ers players
New England Patriots players
Las Vegas Raiders players
Oakland Raiders players
21st-century African-American sportspeople
American Conference Pro Bowl players